Vijayawada Municipal Corporation (VMC) is the civic body that governs the city of Vijayawada in the Indian state of Andhra Pradesh.

History
The Vijayawada Municipality was created on 1 April 1888. It was named as a selection grade municipality in 1960 and to corporation in 1981. In 1985 Gunadala, Patamata and Bhavanipuram village panchayats, Payakapuram, Kundavari Kandrika were merged in the corporation.

Administration 

The Corporation is administered by an elected body headed by the Mayor. The corporation population as per the 2011 census was 1,039,518 with 527,307 males and a female population of 512,211. The present mayor is Rayana Bhagyalakshmi and the municipal commissioner is Swapnil Dinakar Pundakar.

Civic services 

The corporation provides protected drinking water to its public and is the forerunner in the state with every day supply of  water to the city residents. The other services undertaken by the corporation authorities are: Internal roads extension; under ground drainage project with JNNURM; solid waste management which is recycled at waste to energy plants for power production; Health centers; Maternity hospitals; schools from elementary to high schools and even providing midday meals to students.

The Krishna river, groundwater and overhead tanks are the source of drinking water for the city residents. The underground and open draining systems are implemented for wastewater. There are also sewage treatment plants and the Budameru, Gundutippa, Islampeta and HB drains are utilized for draining out waste water. The Railway dumping yard is utilized for solid waste dumping and some of the solid waste produced is made useful by converting them into manures.

Functions 

Vijayawada Municipal Corporation is created for the following functions:

 Planning for the town including its surroundings which are covered under its Department's Urban Planning Authority .

 Approving construction of new buildings and authorising use of land for various purposes.

 Improvement of the town's economic and Social status.

 Arrangements of water supply towards commercial,residential and industrial purposes.

 Planning for fire contingencies through Fire Service Departments.

 Creation of solid waste management,public health system and sanitary services.

 Working for the development of ecological aspect like development of Urban Forestry and making guidelines for environmental protection.

 Working for the development of weaker sections of the society like mentally and physically handicapped,old age and gender biased people.

 Making efforts for improvement of slums and poverty removal in the town.

Revenue sources 

The following are the Income sources for the Corporation from the Central and State Government.

Revenue from taxes 

Following is the Tax related revenue for the corporation.

 Property tax.

 Profession tax.

 Entertainment tax.

 Grants from Central and State Government like Goods and Services Tax.

 Advertisement tax.

Revenue from non-tax sources 

Following is the Non Tax related revenue for the corporation.

 Water usage charges.

 Fees from Documentation services.

 Rent received from municipal property.

 Funds from municipal bonds.

Infrastructure 

Certain municipal sporting infrastructure in the city are maintained by the corporation, which includes, Indira Gandhi Stadium, indoor stadiums, swimming pools and Gymnasiums. There are parks and open spaces as part of city greenery projects.

Awards and achievements 
Accolades and awards won by VMC include:
 National Urban Water Award (2009)
 CRISIL Best Practices Award for the "Siti e-Governance" Project
 CSI Nihilent runner-up award was conferred by Ministry of Information and Technology
 Stockholm Challenge Award finalist
 ISO 9001 Certified for Quality Management System

Elections

2021 VMC election 
Five wards were added, taking the total count of wards to 64.

2014 VMC election 
In 2014, there were 59 wards in the corporation.

2005 VMC election 
Elections were held to the 59 wards in the corporation.

Expansion 
There are numerous proposals to expand the city limits over decades into Greater Municipal Corporation. Enikepadu, Gollapudi, Yanamalakuduru, Nunna, Kanuru,Tadigadapa are some of the major urban commercial areas still lies beyond the corporation borders.

See also 
List of municipal corporations in Andhra Pradesh

References 

Municipal corporations in Andhra Pradesh
Government of Vijayawada
Organisations based in Vijayawada
1888 establishments in India